Marcos Olguín López (born 24 March 2001) is a Spanish footballer who plays as a central defender for CD Mirandés B.

Club career
Born in Madrid, Olguín joined Villarreal CF's youth setup in 2013, aged 12. He left the club on 18 June 2020, after finishing his formation, and subsequently joined Burgos CF, where he was initially assigned to the reserves in Tercera División.

Olguín made his senior debut on 1 November 2020, starting in a 0–2 away loss against Real Ávila CF. The following 26 January, after being a starter, he moved to another reserve team, CD Mirandés B also in the fourth division.

On 1 July 2021, Olguín renewed his contract with the Rojillos for a further year. He made his first team debut on 13 November, coming on as a late substitute for Oriol Rey in a 0–1 Segunda División home loss against SD Huesca.

References

External links

2001 births
Living people
Footballers from Madrid
Spanish footballers
Association football defenders
Segunda División players
Tercera División players
Tercera Federación players
Burgos CF Promesas players
CD Mirandés B players
CD Mirandés footballers